Hoole railway station was on the West Lancashire Railway in England. It was in the civil parish of Little Hoole about a mile from the village of Much Hoole. It opened in 1882 and closed in 1964.

References 

Disused railway stations in South Ribble
Former Lancashire and Yorkshire Railway stations
Railway stations in Great Britain opened in 1882
Beeching closures in England
Railway stations in Great Britain closed in 1964